The 1984 Pacific Coast Athletic Association men's basketball tournament (now known as the Big West Conference men's basketball tournament) was held March 8–10 at The Forum in Inglewood, California.

Third-seeded Fresno State upset top-seeded, defending champions  in the final, 51–49, thus capturing their third PCAA/Big West title (and third in four seasons).

The Bulldogs, in turn, received a bid to the 1984 NCAA tournament, the program's third overall. UNLV, PCAA tournament runners-up, were also included in the NCAA field.

Format
The tournament field remained the same as 1983, with eight total teams, despite the addition of one new team (New Mexico State, from the Missouri Valley) to the PCAA. Instead, only the top eight teams, out of ten, from the regular season standings qualified for the conference tournament. 

All eight teams were placed into the first round, with teams seeded and paired based on regular-season records. After the first round, teams were re-seeded so the highest-remaining team was paired with the lowest-remaining time in one semifinal with the other two teams slotted into the other semifinal.

Bracket

References

Big West Conference men's basketball tournament
Tournament
Pacific Coast Athletic Association men's basketball tournament
Pacific Coast Athletic Association men's basketball tournament